Wilkiea is a genus of dioecious trees and shrubs in the Mollinedieae tribe of the family Monimiaceae. They grow in Australia and New Guinea. Mostly with toothed leaves which have short leaf stems. Leaves with many oil dots. The genus appears to have an Australian or southern origin.

Species
There are 13 species in genus Wilkiea:
 Wilkiea angustifolia (Bailey) Perkins
 Wilkiea austroqueenslandica Domin
 Wilkiea cordata Whiffin
 Wilkiea foremanii Philipson
 Wilkiea huegeliana (Tul.) A.DC.
 Wilkiea hylandii Whiffin
 Wilkiea kaarruana Zich & A.J.Ford
 Wilkiea longipes (Benth.) Whiffin & Foreman
 Wilkiea macrophylla A.DC.
 Wilkiea pubescens (Benth.) Whiffin & Foreman
 Wilkiea rigidifolia (A.C.Sm.) Whiffin & Foreman
 Wilkiea smithii Whiffin
 Wilkiea wardellii (F.Muell.) Perkins

References

Monimiaceae genera
Dioecious plants